María del Carmen Martínez-Bordiú y Franco (born 26 February 1951), commonly known as simply Carmen Martínez-Bordiú, is a former Spanish aristocrat and social figure.

Martínez-Bordiú had been the 2nd Duchess of Franco from July 2018 until revocation of her dukedom and associated grandeeship on 21 October 2022 as a result of the Democratic Memory Law. She is the granddaughter of former Spanish general and dictator Francisco Franco and this law aimed to finally remove some of the remaining Franco symbols from the country, including the abolition of her title of nobility that had been granted to her mother during the regime of General Franco.

Birth and youth
Carmen Martínez-Bordiú was born in the Palacio Real de El Pardo in Madrid and is the daughter of Cristóbal Martínez-Bordiú, 10th Marquis of Villaverde, and Carmen Franco, 1st Duchess of Franco. Her maternal grandparents were the nationalist dictator caudillo Francisco Franco, the Spanish Head of State at the time of her birth and for the next 24 years, and Carmen Polo y Martínez-Valdés, 1st Lady of Meirás. Her paternal grandparents were José María Martínez y Ortega (1890–1970) and María de la O Bordiú y Bascarán, 7th Countess of Argillo (1896–1980). 
Martínez-Bordiú was the first grandchild of General Franco. She was born in the Palacio del Pardo, an ancient palace of the Spanish Royal Family, used as a residence of the president after the declaration of the Spanish Republic, and turned into a republican military site during the Civil war that broke out after Franco's upheaval. The palace was the Franco family residence from 1940, when the Spanish Civil War ended and General Franco became the Spanish Head of State, to after his death in 1975. She has six siblings: María de la O (Mariola), Francisco (Francis), María del Mar (Merry), José Cristóbal (Cristóbal), María de Aránzazu (Arantxa), and Jaime Felipe (Jaime).

First marriage
The 21 year old Martínez-Bordiú was married on 8 March 1972 in the Chapel of the Palace of El Pardo in Madrid to Prince Alfonso, Duke of Anjou, son of Infante Jaime of Spain, Duke of Segovia and grandson of King Alfonso XIII of Spain. General Franco subsequently named Prince Alfonso Duke of Cadiz and made him a Royal Highness.

The Duke of Anjou and Cádiz and Martínez-Bordiú had two sons:
Prince François, Duke of Bourbon (22 November 1972, in Madrid – 7 February 1984, in Pamplona).
Prince Louis, Duke of Anjou (born 1974).

General Franco died on 20 November 1975 and the family lost their political power. Alfonso and Carmen separated in 1979, received a civil divorce 1982 and a Catholic annulment in 1986. Alfonso was given custody of their sons.

Second marriage and family tragedies
After separating from the Duke of Anjou, Martínez-Bordiú lived with a Frenchman, Jean-Marie Rossi (18 November 1930 – 5 December 2021) who was 20 years older than her. Rossi was divorced from Barbara Hottinguer, by whom he had twin daughters Mathilda and Marella (b. 1971), and a son, Frederick. Martínez-Bordiú and Rossi were married in a civil ceremony on 11 December 1984 in Rueil-Malmaison, with Martínez-Bordiú already around five months pregnant. By the time the new child was born, she and her new husband would have witnessed the death of one child each. In February, Martínez-Bordiú's son, Francisco de Asís, died in a car accident. Only weeks later, Rossi's daughter, Mathilda, died in a boating accident. Martínez-Bordiú then gave birth to her last child, María Cynthia Francisca Matilda Rossi, in Paris on 28 April 1985, barely four months after her wedding.

In January 1989, Martínez-Bordiú's first husband, the Duke of Anjou, died in a skiing accident in Colorado. He had had custody of their surviving son, Prince Louis Alphonse, and Martínez-Bordiú became involved in a legal battle with her former mother-in-law for custody of the young boy. She lost the battle and her mother-in-law gained custody. Carmen and her second husband Rossi separated in 1994 and divorced in 1995. She then lived with an Italian man, Roberto Federici, with the relationship ending in 2004.

Third marriage and first grandchildren
On 18 June 2006 in Cazalla de la Sierra, Seville, she married a third time to a Spaniard, José Campos García (born in Santander, 13 years her junior). She became a grandmother on 6 March 2007 with the birth of granddaughter Eugenia. In 2006, she was a contestant on "Mira quién baila!" ("Look Who's Dancing!"), the Spanish version of "Strictly Come Dancing". On 28 May 2010, Martínez-Bordiú had twin grandsons, Luis and Alfonso. Another grandson, Henri, followed on 1 February 2019.

Arms

References and notes

 Hola magazine website article 
 20 Minutos article 
 José Apezarena, Luis Alfonso de Borbón: Un príncipe a la espera, Plaza & Janés, 2007. 
 
 
 Marc Dem, Le duc d'Anjou m'a dit - La vie de l'aîné des Bourbons, Perrin, Paris, 1989.     

|-

|-

|-

1951 births
Living people
Nobility from Madrid
Francoist Spain
House of Bourbon (Spain)
Duchesses of Anjou
Duchesses of Bourbon
Dukes of Cádiz
Dukes of Franco